Mustang Heart is the fourth studio album by Canadian country music artist George Fox. It was released by Warner Music Canada in 1993. The album peaked at number 7 on the RPM Country Albums chart and was certified gold by the CRIA.

Track listing
"Mustang Heart"
"Daughter of the Rockies"
"Great Big Green Eyes"
"Breakfast Alone"
"Wear and Tear on My Heart"
"Better Love Next Time"
"Honest Man"
"No Hasta la Vista Tonight"
"Good Memories"
"Clearly Canadian"

Chart performance

References

External links
[ Mustang Heart] at Allmusic

1993 albums
George Fox albums
Albums produced by Bob Gaudio